The 1974 New Zealand Grand Prix was a race held at the Wigram Airfield Circuit on 19 January 1974.  The race had 20 starters. This was the first and only New Zealand Grand Prix to be held at the Wigram Airfield Circuit, and the race was also the 1974 Lady Wigram Trophy. The race was moved to Wigram from the usual Pukekohe to be part of the Commonwealth Games being held in Christchurch.

It was the 20th New Zealand Grand Prix, 23rd Lady Wigram Trophy and doubled as the third round of the 1974 Tasman Series,   Australian John McCormack won his second NZGP in succession in his Elfin MR5 who finished ahead of Belgian Teddy Pilette and Briton Peter Gethin. The first New Zealand driver to finish was David Oxton in the Begg FM5 who came in 4th place.

Classification

References

Grand Prix
New Zealand Grand Prix
Tasman Series
January 1974 sports events in New Zealand